The 2007 Southland Conference men's basketball tournament took place March 8–11, 2007, at the Campbell Center in Houston, Texas.

Format
The top eight eligible men's basketball teams in the Southland Conference receive a berth in the conference tournament.  After the conference season, teams are seeded by conference record.

Bracket

Championship game

Texas A&M-Corpus Christi defeated Northwestern State, 81–78 and never trailed in the game. They got 19 points from tournament MVP Chris Daniels. Daniels, the conference player of the year, was 7-for-8 despite being double- and sometimes triple-teamed. Corpus Christi led by eight at halftime.

It was 79–78 with five seconds remaining, and Northwestern State was forced to foul. Josh Ervin made two free throws to put Corpus Christi up three. Taureen Mitchell intercepted Northwestern's final pass to end the game. Trey Gilder led Northwestern State with 25 points, hitting all seven of his free throws and both of his three-point attempts.

Sources
Southland Conference archives

References

Tournament
Southland Conference men's basketball tournament
Southland Conference men's basketball tournament
Southland Conference men's basketball tournament